State Route 68 (SR 68) is a state highway in the U.S. state of California, located entirely in Monterey County. It runs from Asilomar State Beach in Pacific Grove to U.S. Route 101 in Salinas.

Route description

SR 68 begins as Asilomar Avenue in the city of Pacific Grove at an intersection with Sinex Avenue, at the entrance to Asilomar Conference Grounds of Asilomar State Beach. The highway continues south to an intersection with Sunset Drive, turning east on Sunset Drive before continuing south after roughly half a mile onto Forest Avenue. Soon after entering Monterey and passing by the Presidio of Monterey, SR 68 becomes the W.R. Holman Highway until its junction with SR 1 at the terminus of the 17 Mile Drive.

SR 68 is concurrent with SR 1 for  until nearing the Monterey County Fairgrounds. At this point, SR 68 exits SR 1 as the Monterey-Salinas Highway, which is a freeway for the first half mile. The freeway becomes a highway and passes by the Monterey Regional Airport, intersecting SR 218 at Del Rey Oaks, continuing for  towards Salinas. The route goes past Pasadera, WeatherTech Raceway Laguna Seca, Laureles Grade, Corral De Tierra, San Benancio, Toro Park and Spreckels, becoming a freeway for the last  before Salinas, eventually turning north. At the city limits, SR 68 becomes South Main Street and continues to downtown. SR 68 makes a right off of Main and follows John Street to its terminus at U.S. Route 101.

Highway 68 is heavily traveled.  The road has a design capacity of 16,000 vehicles per day.  , it carries about 26,000 vehicles per day, and this figure is projected to increase as residential development in and around Salinas continues, and the Monterey Peninsula's tourism economy continues to expand. Highway 68 and the "68" road symbol have become iconic in Pacific Grove skating culture.  This association developed after the opening of the skate shop "68 Skate".

SR 68 is part of the California Freeway and Expressway System, and east of SR 1 is part of the National Highway System, a network of highways that are considered essential to the country's economy, defense, and mobility by the Federal Highway Administration. SR 68 is eligible for the State Scenic Highway System; however, only the part from SR 1 to the Salinas River is designated by Caltrans as a scenic highway. State Route 68 is part of the Juan De Anza Trail.

History
Highway 68 is part of the DeAnza Trail, a route that linked all of California's mission settlements during the Spanish colonial period.  With the advent of the automobile, Highway 68 was upgraded from a dirt wagon road to a 2-lane paved road in 1937.

During the 1950s and 1960s, Caltrans had planned to upgrade Highway 68 to a freeway between Salinas and Highway 1 in Monterey, that was to start at US 101 south of the city and proceed west between Salinas and Spreckels, serving as a bypass for Salinas. The freeway was to then follow the existing Highway 68 alignment into Monterey.

The freeway plan died as a result of environmental concerns along the route. The only portions of this freeway that were actually built were a  section approaching the Highway 1 interchange in Monterey, and a  segment starting in Spreckels and heading west, bypassing the unincorporated village of Toro Park.  The segment around Spreckels opened in 1967 and included a pair of new bridges spanning the Salinas River, which replaced an old truss bridge built in 1889. At the western terminus of the Spreckels freeway segment, land acquired for the freeway can still be seen.

There continues to be discussions, but no definitive plans, to either bypass Route 68 or convert the existing road to 4-lanes by building a second roadway alongside the present 2-lane carriageway. Caltrans and Monterey County officials mention the most practical route for a bypass would be to the north of the existing Route 68, through Fort Ord. A major upgrade of the Highway 68 corridor would cost on the order of $300 million.  In the fall of 2007, Caltrans is scheduled to begin a $6 million project to implement safety upgrades at three major intersections along Highway 68.

Meanwhile, Caltrans and Monterey County are proceeding with a plan to divert Monterey-Salinas traffic away from Highway 68 by converting Davis Road and Reservation Road from two lanes to four between Highway 101 on the north side of Salinas and Highway 1 in Marina.  These two roads pass through Fort Ord and the upgrades are using excess land set aside following the base's closure in 1994.  The Davis Road/Reservation Road upgrade is a short-term fix, and most state and county officials realize that a permanent fix for Highway 68 will eventually be necessary.

Major intersections

See also

References

 State Route 68

External links

California @ AARoads.com - State Route 68
Caltrans: Route 68 highway conditions
California Highways: SR 68

068
068
State Route 068
068
Pacific Grove, California
Monterey, California
Salinas, California